Khairpur is a village and union council, an administrative subdivision, of Chakwal District in the Punjab Province of Pakistan, located in Kahoun valley, at latitude 32 43'56.53", longitude 72 47'27.21", mid of the Salt Range at about 2600 feet elevation, with a moderate climate. After carving out of New District of Chakwal in 1985 from Jhelum and Attock, this subdivision was detached from Pind Dadan Khan Tehsil of Jhelum District and was included into Tehsil Chakwal. Now village Khairpur is a part of Kallar Kahar Tehsil, located on the road leading to Choa Saiden Shah 10 Kilometres eastward of Kallar Kahar motorway interchange.

The soil is thin and stony and cultivation depends upon the capricious rainfall in these blue serrated hills. Agriculture and military service were the main professions of residents until a few years ago. Now the population are entering employment in sectors such as education, healthcare and business. The old name Khardare was changed to Khairpur in 1947.

History
Nobody exactly knows when this settlement came into existence. It is believed that the early settlers like other Awan Tribes came with Qutab Shah, the ruler of Herat and a general in Ghaznavids Army during the expedition of subcontinent in 11th century and settled at Kharli in Wanhár Area in western Salt Range. Later one elder of the clan migrated to the present place. This small hamlet which was built up on a steep hillock to defend from the other warrior tribes turned into a village with the passage of time. The village was named as Khardehr with association to Kharli.
Nothing is known about Mughal period and other rulers time.
As listened by elder the worst time for the village was Sikh Raj (1801–1849), when the gangs of Sikh Bandits and their tax collector(Kárdár) used to extort the produce as they desired from the threshing-floor at the time of harvesting.

The Tribe is further subdivided into clans "Virrhees" with association to their elders.
 Majhial
 Janial
 Mumial
 Gulsherias
 Charkhal
 Akbral
 Phails
 Ujrals
 Bhudhials
 Roadas
 Pathlial
 Chiddas
 Artisans

Governmental institutions
A middle school was established by the District Board Jhelum in 1928 which was upgraded to a high school in 1984. A primary school for girls was set up in 1962 which is now a full-fledged high school.
During the General Ayub Khan's "Basic Democracy" era, a union council Headquarters at Khairpur was established in 1962, comprising upon 9 villages: Khokhar Bala, Dlailpur, Khandowa, Chak Khushi, Simbal, Chhoi, Malot, Warraala and Karouli including its hamlets.

A Basic Health Unit started providing primary health care facility to the people in 1982. In 1974 the existing branch Post office was upgraded to sub-post office where the military pension can be withdrawn by retired army personnel. A veterinary hospital is also functioning since 30 years.

War services
Being a martial tribe and enlisted for military recruitment, a number of veterans participated in the World War I and WW2 during the British raj and fought bravely on different war fronts. In recognition of their services, some people were granted agriculture land in newly settled canal colonies. It is worth mentioning that Gulab Din S/O Feteh Din Khardher Sapper of Royal Bombay Sappers fought bravely at Singapore front and died on 25 February 1944. His name is included in the Roll of honour for Singapore war memorial by the Government of the United Kingdom.

A gallantry award Sitara-e-Jurat was awarded to Maj. Shah Nawaz Shaheed in Indo-Pakistani War of 1965. A road in Karachi Cantonment was christened in commemoration of this Hero of Chumb Jorrian Sector, Col M. Yaqoob Malik of 53rd Artillery Regiment(a reluctant hero) fought bravely in Kumila East Pakistan (now Bangladesh) in 1971 and succeeded in disarming about 300 disaffected Bengali Army officers.

Name of martyrs of 1965 IndoPak War
 Muhammad Nawaz S/O Adli KhanMuhammad Bashir S/O Khuda Dad
 Muhammad Amir (missing in action) S/O Shahdama Khan
 N/Sub: Nazir Ahmed (missing in action) S/O Master PirDad

Martyrs of 1971 Indo-Pak War in East Pakistan
 Muhammad Aslam S/O Sardar Ali
 Muhammad Aslam S/O Hasat Khan
 Nisar Ahmed S/O Master PirDad

The Spiritual Sovereign

Pir Walyiat Hussain Shah Hashmi
Khairpur is the birth and eternal rest place of a Majdhúb Wali, an enraptured saint. Pir Walyiat Hussan Shah, a Hashmyite (descendant of Muhammad) commonly known as "Wali-e- Walyiat" (holder of spiritual territory) by his faithfuls. His mausoleum, a typical Muslim shrine architecture, an octagonal building on a square citadel with a dome and cupola is visible from a long distance. He died at Jhelum in June 1967 and his body was brought and buried in old graveyard. But later his coffin was reburied at the present place for which the land was endowed by spouse of Malik Haitam Khan village headman and his sons. Since four decades his Murids (disciples) and followers, those are spread mostly in Jhelum and Mirpur tract, where the saint spent most of his lifetime, celebrate the "Urs" (the festival commemorating the death anniversary) of their preceptor and intercessor with utmost veneration every year on 5 –6 June. This Urs cum Mela (Fair) has transformed into the cultural identity of the area, Bull race,"Jalsa" is the event which has been eagerly anticipated by the locals.

References

External links 
 http://www.roll-of-honour.org.uk/Cemeteries/Singapore_Memorial/G/html/gu.htm
 http://www.millat.com/events/hamood/001.htm

Populated places in Chakwal District